Dragan "Don" Popovic (Serbian Cyrillic: Драган Дон Поповић; born 1 January 1941) is a retired professional soccer midfielder and coach in the United States. He played professionally in Yugoslavia, Canada and the North American Soccer League. He later coached in both the North American Soccer League and Major Indoor Soccer League.

In 1993 became the director of the youth soccer, Lou Fusz Soccer Club, which has teams playing in the St. Louis Youth Soccer Association (SLYSA) soccer league and the Midwest Regional League (MRL)

Playing career

Club
Popovic turned professional in 1958 at age 17 in Yugoslavia. In 1967, he moved to the United States to play for the St. Louis Stars of the first National Professional Soccer League. In 1968, the NPSL merged with the United Soccer Association to form the North American Soccer League. That year, Popovic moved to the Kansas City Spurs where he played at least one full year and perhaps part of another. In 1969, he moved back to the Stars where he finished his NASL playing career in 1971. He then moved to Canada where he played for the Toronto White Eagles of the Canadian National Soccer League until 1973. That year, he played for the Canadian national team in an exhibition game with Arsenal F.C.

Managerial career
While playing for the St. Louis Stars, Popovic also served as an assistant coach. In 1974, Popovic became the head coach of the Toronto White Eagles. He took the team to the 1975 Canadian National Soccer League championship. In 1976, the Rochester Lancers of the North American Soccer League hired Popovic as head coach. In 1978, the New York Arrows entered the newly created Major Indoor Soccer League. It drew most of its players from the Lancers and hired Popovic as head coach. He led the Arrows to four consecutive MISL championships (1979–1982). The Arrows fired him at the end of February 1983 and he was hired a week later to coach the Golden Bay Earthquakes. He coached the Earthquakes during the 1983 and 1985 outdoor seasons as well as the 1983–1984 indoor season. The Earthquakes sat out the 1984–1985 indoor season. On 16 December 1984, the Las Vegas Americans hired Popovic to replace player-coach Alan Mayer as head coach. When the Americans folded in June 1985, Popovic was hired by the Pittsburgh Spirit. The Spirit folded at the end of the season and Popovic committed to coaching a team in Portugal. In December 1985, the New York Express made an offer to hire Popovic. While he began running practices and overseeing player acquisitions and even coached one games in late January 1987, the team never signed him to a contract. When no coaching jobs became available, Popovic entered the real estate business. In 1989, the expansion St. Louis Storm hired Popovic. He coached the team for nearly three seasons before being fired in March 1992. He was inducted into the St. Louis Soccer Hall of Fame in 2004.

Honors
 1971 – NASL All League First Team, while playing for the St. Louis Stars
 1971 – NASL All Tournament, while playing for the St. Louis Stars in an indoor tournament
 1981 – Coach of the Year while coaching the New York Arrows
 1983 – Coach of the Year while coaching the Golden Bay Earthquakes
 2004 – Inducted into the St. Louis Soccer Hall of Fame

Youth Soccer Highlights
Popovic was the head coach for the following championship teams:
 2000 Missouri State Cup, Boys U-13 (under 13 years of age)
 2001 Missouri State Cup, Boys U-14 (under 14 years of age)
 2008 Missouri State Cup, Boys U-14 (under 14 years of age) 
 2007 Missouri State Cup, Boys U-13 (under 13 years of age)
 2006 Missouri State Cup, Boys U-15 (under 15 years of age) 
 2003 Missouri State Cup, Boys U-15 (under 15 years of age)* 2010 Missouri State Cup, Boys U-16 (under 16 years of age)

References

External links
 Don Popovic's bio on the Lou Fusz Soccer Club web site
 NASL stats
 CSA - Real estate Coaching
 TeamMania.net :: Lou Fusz Soccer Club >> Lou Fusz Strikers Soccer Club

1941 births
Living people
People from Berane
Serbs of Montenegro
American people of Serbian descent
Association football midfielders
Yugoslav footballers
Red Star Belgrade footballers
HNK Hajduk Split players
St. Louis Stars (soccer) players
Kansas City Spurs players
Serbian White Eagles FC players
National Professional Soccer League (1967) players
North American Soccer League (1968–1984) players
North American Soccer League (1968–1984) indoor players
Canadian National Soccer League players
Yugoslav expatriate footballers
Expatriate soccer players in the United States
Yugoslav expatriate sportspeople in the United States
Expatriate soccer players in Canada
Yugoslav expatriate sportspeople in Canada
American soccer coaches
Yugoslav football managers
Serbian White Eagles FC managers
San Jose Earthquakes (1974–1988) coaches
Canadian National Soccer League coaches
Major Indoor Soccer League (1978–1992) coaches
North American Soccer League (1968–1984) coaches